Vagabond is a 2019 South Korean television series starring Lee Seung-gi, Bae Suzy and Shin Sung-rok. It aired on SBS TV from September 20 to November 23, 2019 for 16 episodes. Each episode was released on Netflix in South Korea and internationally after their television broadcast.

Synopsis
Cha Dal-gun (Lee Seung-gi) works as an underrated stuntman, while simultaneously taking care of his orphaned nephew, Cha Hoon (Moon Woo-jin). Although they have a fairly loving relationship, Hoon argues with his uncle before he leaves to go on a field trip to Morocco. Just before the plane takes off, Hoon sends a video of himself encouraging Dal-gun to continue following his dream to become a master in Taekwondo. At a drama set Dal-gun watches a report of a plane crash that killed over 200 civilians due to structural failure. 

He is completely shocked when he realizes that it is the exact same plane his nephew had taken to Morocco. With his world now turned upside down, Dal-gun travels to Morocco to attend the funeral for all the victims of the plane crash, grieving for the loss of his nephew. Dal-gun is about to return home, when he recognizes a supposedly dead passenger from the video his nephew had recorded. He manages to confront the man and slowly begins to realize that the plane crash was not caused by a malfunction. 

However, any evidence he finds is mysteriously erased and his life is threatened whenever he tries to prove to others that the plane crash was not an accident. As the situation grows more complex, he is forced to become partners with Go Hae-ri (Bae Suzy), a covert operative for the National Intelligence Service striving for a promotion. Determined to find out the truth behind the accident, Dal-gun and Hae-ri embark on an investigation that leads them deeper into a tangled web of corruption.

Cast

Main
 Lee Seung-gi as Cha Dal-gun
 Dal-gun is a stuntman whose nephew Cha Hoon was a victim of the B357 plane crash, which involved a ring of terrorists and governmental conspiracies attempting to cover it up. To expose their secrets, Dal-gun teams up with Hae-ri and the NIS to investigate and ultimately get justice. 
 Bae Suzy as Go Hae-ri 
 Hae-ri is a NIS (National Intelligence Service) agent who chose the life of a civil servant to support her family but ends up becoming a covert operative. 
 Shin Sung-rok as Gi Tae-ung
 Head of the National Intelligence Agency's information team.

Supporting

People at the Blue House
 Baek Yoon-sik as Jung Kook-pyo
 The President of Korea.
 Moon Sung-keun as Hong Soon-jo
 Prime Minister of South Korea.
 Kim Min-jong as Yoon Han-ki/Agent Shadow
 Secretary of Civil Affairs.
 Choi Kwang-il as Park Man-young
 Minister of National Defense.

People at NIS
 Kim Jong-soo as An Ki-dong
 Director General of the NIS.
 Lee Ki-young as Kang Joo-chul
 Director of the NIS.
 Jung Man-sik as Min Jae-sik
 Hae-ri's boss at the NIS.
 Hwang Bo-ra as Gong Hwa-sook
 NIS staff member and Go Hae-ri's friend.
 Shin Seung-hwan as Kim Se-hun
 NIS staff.

People of Arms lobby group
 Lee Geung-young as Edward Park (Korean name: Park Ki-pyo)/
 Head of D.K.P (Dynamic KP), a group of the Dynamic Systems Corporation.
 Moon Jeong-hee as Jessica Lee
 President-in-charge of the Asian branch of John & Mark.
 Ryu Won as Mickey
 Edward Park's assistant.
 Kim Jung-hyun as Hong Seung-beom
 Jessica's aide.

People at Vagabond
 Kim Sun-young as Kye Sun-ja
 Yang Hyung-wook as tech genius Kye Jang-su who has Savant syndrome.

Others
 Jang Hyuk-jin as Kim Woo-gi, co-pilot of B357 plane who was bribed to crash the plane with Jerome. 
 Kang Kyung-hun as Oh Sang-mi, Kim Woo-gi's wife
 Lee Si-yoo as Seo Young-ji
 Teo Yoo as Jerome, a former mercenary involved in the crash of the B357 plane, alongside Kim Woo-gi. 
 Park Ah-in as Lily, an assassin hired by Jessica to kill Cha Dal-gun and Kim Woo-gi. 
 Choi Dae-chul as Kim Do-soo, a North Korean defector working under Min Jae-sik's orders and later works for Lily.  
 Kim Dae-gon as Ui Jeong's father	
 Ko Kyu-pil as Park Kwang-deok, husband of one of the victims of the B357 plane crash who owns a judo gym. 
 Yoo Hyung-kwan
 Matthew Douma

Special appearances
 Moon Woo-jin as Cha Hoon, Cha Dal-gun's nephew (Ep. 1, 7, 9) and one of the victims of the B357 plane crash.
 Jung Hyun-joon as a young Cha Hoon (ep. 1-2)
 António Pedro Cerdeira as Michael, the VP of John & Mark Asia, implicated in the crash of the B357 plane. He was killed in Portugal at the beginning of the series when he attempted to abort the crash.
 Seo Sang-won as Choi Jeong-woon - Airplane captain
 Yoon Na-moo as Kim Ho-sik (Embassy staff)
 Lee Hwang-ui as Dr. Kevin Kim
 Yoon Da-hoon as Judge Ahn Seung-tae

Production

Development
 Lee Seung-gi and Bae Suzy previously starred together in Gu Family Book (2013).
 The series is the fourth collaboration between screenwriters Jang Young-chul and Jung Kyung-soon and director Yoo In-sik after Giant (2010), History of a Salaryman (2012), and Incarnation of Money (2013).
 The first script reading was held on June 2, 2018.

Filming
Filming began in June 2018 and the series is entirely pre-produced. Overseas filming took place in Tangier and Medina in Morocco. In addition, some scenes were filmed in the desert and in Portugal.

Release
Originally scheduled to air in end-2018, the series was pushed back to May 2019, and then again due to filming schedule issues and a pending deal with Netflix. It aired in September 2019.

Original soundtrack

Part 1

Part 2

Part 3

Part 4

Part 5

Part 6

Part 7

Part 8

Part 9

Viewership

Awards and nominations

Notes

References

External links
   
 
 
 

Seoul Broadcasting System television dramas
2019 South Korean television series debuts
2019 South Korean television series endings
South Korean thriller television series
South Korean action television series
South Korean crime television series
South Korean espionage television series
National Intelligence Service (South Korea) in fiction
South Korean pre-produced television series
Television series by Sony Pictures Television
Television series by Celltrion Entertainment
Korean-language Netflix exclusive international distribution programming